Teochew opera or Chaozhou opera, Chiuchow opera (especially in Hong Kong), is one of the many variants of Chinese opera, originating in southern China's Chaoshan region. It is popular in eastern Guangdong, southern Fujian, Hong Kong, Macau, Thailand, Vietnam, Singapore, Indonesia, Malaysia and Cambodia. Like all versions of Chinese opera, it is a traditional Chinese art form, involving music, singing, martial arts, acrobatics and acting.

References

External links

Chinese opera
Teochew culture